EPSF may refer to:

 Encapsulated PostScript file, an image file format
 polystyrene
 Egyptian Pharmaceutical Students' Federation